The Directorate-General for Interpretation (also known as DG Interpretation and SCIC for its former French name Service Commun Interprétation-Conférences) is a Directorate-General of the European Commission. 
It is the European Commission's interpreting service and conference organiser and provides interpreters for around 11,000 meetings every year, thus being the largest interpreting service in the world.

DG Interpretation manages the allocation of Commission meeting rooms and provides support for the smooth running of meetings in many languages that are held there. It also organises conferences for Directorates-General and departments of the Commission, typically in the range of over 40 main events per year.

In 2016, Florika Fink-Hooijer became the Director-General of DG Interpretation. In 2020, Genoveva Ruiz Calavera took over the role after Fink-Hooijer stepped down.

See also
 European Commissioner for Budget and Administration

References

External links 
 Directorate-General for Interpretation

Interpretation
Language policy of the European Union